J1 World Tour was the first concert tour by Taiwanese singer Jolin Tsai. It started on August 7, 2004, in Shanghai, China at Hongkou Football Stadium and continued throughout Asia and North America before concluding on April 22, 2006, in Irvine, United States at Bren Events Center.

Background 
On March 7, 2003, Tsai released her fifth studio album, Magic. It sold more more than 1.5 million copies in Asia. In Taiwan, it sold more than 360,000 copies, becoming the year's highest-selling album by a female artist and the year's second highest-selling album overall in the country. The album was nominated a Golden Melody Award for Album of the Year, she was nominated for Best Female Mandarin Singer, and Baby Chung was nominated for Best Music Arrangement for "Prague Square". Eventually, Baby Chung won Best Music Arrangement.

On February 27, 2004, she released her sixth studio album, Castle. On the same day, she revealed that she would start her first concert tour in the second half of the year. On July 8, 2004, she announced that he would embark on the J1 World Tour in Shanghai, China at Hongkou Football Stadium on August 7, 2004. Tsai said: "After joining in Sony, my first promotional event's location is Shanghai, so I bring my first China concert to Shanghai, thank you everyone."

Video release 

On September 7, 2005, Sony BMG announced that they would release a live video album for the tour on September 16, 2005. On September 13, 2005, Sony BMG announced that the album release would be postponed to September 23, 2005. On September 23, 2005, Sony BMG released the live video album J1 Live Concert, which includes the performance of the tour held in Taipei, Taiwan at Chungshan Soccer Stadium on November 20, 2004 and one new song, "Paradise". It was the first live video album in the history of Chinese singers using HDTV and Dolby Digital 5.1 technologies.

It peaked at number one on the video album sales charts in Taiwan, including G-Music and Five Music, and it topped the video album sales charts of G-Music and Five Music for 12 consecutive weeks and 5 consecutive weeks, respectively. It topped the 2005 video album sales chart of Five Music.

Set list

Shows

References 

2004 concert tours
2005 concert tours
2006 concert tours
Concert tours of China
Concert tours of Malaysia
Concert tours of Singapore
Concert tours of Taiwan
Concert tours of the United States
Jolin Tsai concert tours